Sir Rex Edward Richards  (28 October 1922 – 15 July 2019) was a British scientist and academic. He served as Vice-Chancellor of the University of Oxford and as a director of the Leverhulme Trust.

Education
Richards was educated at Colyton Grammar School, and became the first pupil from the school to attend the University of Oxford when he went up to St John's College, Oxford in January 1942. He was awarded a first class Bachelor of Arts degree in 1945 and a Doctor of Philosophy in 1948.

Career
After graduating, Richards stayed at the university as a Fellow in Chemistry at Lincoln College from 1947 to 1964. In 1964 he succeeded Sir Cyril Hinshelwood as Dr Lee's Professor of Chemistry at Exeter College. In 1969, he became Warden of Merton College. Richards held the post of Vice Chancellor of the university from 1977 to 1981 and was Director of IBM (UK) Ltd from 1978 to 1983 and Director of the Leverhulme Trust from 1984 to 1993. He was President of the Royal Society of Chemistry for two years, and the Royal Society awarded him the Davy Medal in 1976 and the Royal Medal in 1986. He was knighted in 1977. He was also Chancellor of the University of Exeter from 1982 to October 1998. A painted portrait of Richards by Allan Ramsay hangs in the Senate and Council Chamber, Northcote House, University of Exeter, and another by Bryan Organ in Merton College, Oxford.

Richards chaired numerous committees concerned with higher education, including an independent enquiry to investigate factors that might deter young physicians and dentists from choosing clinical academic careers.

Richards maintained an interest in the art world as well; he was a member of the National Gallery Scientific Advisory Committee from 1978 to 2007 and its chairman from 1991 to 1993. In 1981, Richards became a founding member of the World Cultural Council. He was Trustee of the Tate Gallery from 1982 to 1988 and 1989–1993, of the National Gallery from 1982 to 1988 and 1989–1993, and of the Henry Moore Foundation from 1989 to 2002; he was Chairman of the Moore from 1994 to 2001. He was also Chairman of the British Postgraduate Medical Foundation from 1986 to 1993.

Richards's research work in the Physical and Theoretical Chemistry Laboratory at Oxford was primarily concerned with nuclear magnetic resonance; the magnet from his 1956 prototype is in the collection of the Science Museum, London.. His early work, leading to the award of a DPhil. in 1948, was on infrared spectroscopy and was supervised by Harold Warris Thompson.

Awards and honours
Richards was elected a Fellow of the Royal Society, a Fellow of the Royal Society of Chemistry in 1970, and won the Davy Medal in 1976. His nomination for the Royal Society reads:

Personal life
In 1948 Richards married Eva Vago; the couple had two daughters. Eva Richards died in 2009.

References

External links 

 Prototype nmr magnet (1956) in the collection of the Science Museum, London
Permanent nmr magnet (1959) in the collection of the Science Museum, London 

1922 births
People from East Devon District
Alumni of St John's College, Oxford
Fellows of Lincoln College, Oxford
Fellows of Exeter College, Oxford
Fellows of Merton College, Oxford
Wardens of Merton College, Oxford
Fellows of St John's College, Oxford
Chancellors of the University of Exeter
Fellows of the Royal Society
Fellows of the Royal Society of Chemistry
English chemists
Royal Medal winners
Knights Bachelor
Vice-Chancellors of the University of Oxford
People associated with the National Gallery, London
People associated with the Tate galleries
Presidents of the Royal Society of Chemistry
Dr Lee's Professors of Chemistry
Founding members of the World Cultural Council
2019 deaths
Honorary Fellows of the British Academy